Wang Jun'an (born 5 June 1970) is a Chinese Yue opera singer-actress who specializes in young sheng (male) roles. One of Yin Guifang's most prized students, she is the top star of the Fujian Fanghua Yue Drama Troupe based in Fuzhou. Wang Jun'an won the Plum Blossom Award in 2015 and the Magnolia Stage Award in 2014. She is affectionately nicknamed "White Horse" by her large fanbase, which "rival[s] that of a famous pop star".

Rare for a traditional Chinese opera performer, Wang Jun'an received her college education in the west — she holds a degree in economics and financial management from the Catholic University of America and lived for a decade in the U.S. before returning to China. In 2014–15 she became an artist in residence for the Five College Consortium and gave lectures at Mount Holyoke College, Amherst College, and Harvard University.

Repertoire (incomplete)

References

External links

1970 births
Living people
Yue opera actresses
Catholic University of America alumni
21st-century Chinese actresses
20th-century Chinese actresses
Chinese film actresses
Actresses from Shaoxing
Singers from Zhejiang
People from Shengzhou
Chinese television actresses
Male impersonators in Yue opera
Musicians from Shaoxing
20th-century Chinese women singers
21st-century Chinese women singers